Druceiella momus is a species of moth of the family Hepialidae first described by Herbert Druce in 1890. It is known from Ecuador.

References

External links
Hepialidae genera

Moths described in 1890
Hepialidae